Pristinamycin IIB is an antibiotic of the streptogramin A class.  It was isolated from Streptomyces pristinaespiralis  and its chemical structure was first determined in 1966.

See also
 Pristinamycin IIA

References

Macrolide antibiotics
Oxazoles